The Pacific Place Jakarta is a multipurpose building located in the Sudirman Central Business District,  South Jakarta, Indonesia. The building is divided into three different sections: the six-floor Pacific Place Mall, the One Pacific Place Office Center, The Ritz-Carlton Pacific Place hotel, ballroom, and service apartment, and Pacific Place Residence. The mall opened in November 2007, and in January 2017 was recognized by Forbes as one of the top shopping malls in Jakarta.

Shops and building inside
The basement level includes Kem Chicks supermarket, restaurants, ATMs, and a bridge to the Ritz Carlton Hotel towers, and the Jakarta Stock Exchange. The Ritz Carlton Pacific Place is the only hotel in the building and has 62 rooms. The One Pacific Place building is the only office block of the building, located north of the building. Galeries Lafayette, the luxurious French department store, had opened a branch in the mall as of 2013, the second of its kind after Dubai in Asia. In 2015, Prada and Miu Miu have both opened their respective stores in this mall.

See also

List of shopping malls in Indonesia

References

Shopping malls in Jakarta
South Jakarta